Charles Doolittle Walcott Medal is an award presented by the National Academy of Sciences every five years to promote research and study in the fields of Precambrian and Cambrian life and history.

The medal was established and endowed in 1934 by the Walcott Fund, a gift of Mary Vaux Walcott, in honor of paleontologist Charles Doolittle Walcott (1850-1927). The medal was sculpted by Laura Gardin Fraser.

Since 2008 the award has been linked to the Stanley Miller Medal and the two medals are now presented  alternately, known collectively as the NAS Award in Early Earth and Life Sciences. Each medal is supplemented by a $10,000 award.

Medalists
Source: NAS

See also

 List of paleontology awards

References

Awards established in 1934
Awards of the United States National Academy of Sciences
Paleontology awards
1934 establishments in the United States